Molodki is a rural locality (a village) in Chyobsarskoye Urban Settlement, Sheksninsky District, Vologda Oblast, Russia. The population was 17 as of 2002.

Geography 
Molodki is located 25 km east of Sheksna (the district's administrative centre) by road. Slavyanka is the nearest rural locality.

References 

Rural localities in Sheksninsky District